Wilshire Heights is a residential neighborhood in eastern Dallas, Texas (USA). It is adjacent to several East Dallas neighborhoods including: Lakewood, Stonewall Terrace, Lakewood Heights, and Caruth Terrace.

Wilshire Heights is bound by Abrams Street to the east, East Mockingbird Lane to the north, Skillman Street to the west, and Mercedes Avenue to the south.

Education
It is within the Dallas Independent School District. Residents are zoned to: Mockingbird Elementary School, J.L. Long Middle School, and Woodrow Wilson High School.

The Roman Catholic Diocese of Dallas operates St. Thomas Aquinas Catholic School, a K-8 school in the area. It has separate facilities for grades Pre-Kindergarten through 2 (lower school) and grades 3-8 (upper school): the upper school is in Wilshire Heights, while the lower school is in Caruth Terrace.

References

External links
 http://wilshireheights.org/

Neighborhoods in East Dallas